The 2009 Arab Athletics Championships was the sixteenth edition of the international athletics competition between Arab countries which took place in Damascus, Syria from 6–9 October.

Medal summary

Men

Women

Medal table

Overall

Men

Women

References

Arab Championships, Damascus (Syria) 06-9/10. Africa Athle (October 2009). Retrieved on 2013-11-02.

Arab Athletics Championships
International athletics competitions hosted by Syria
Sport in Damascus
Arab Athletics Championships
Arab Athletics Championships
21st century in Damascus